George Smith (30 April 1765 – 26 December 1836) was a British Member of Parliament (MP), banker and director of the East India Company.

He was the fifth son of Abel Smith, a wealthy Nottingham banker and Member of Parliament. Four of his brothers were also members of parliament and one, Robert, was raised to the peerage as Baron Carrington. A portion of the family wealth was devoted to buying control of two pocket boroughs, Wendover and Midhurst, and Carrington kept the seats here almost exclusively for use by various members of the Smith family until his power was ended by the Great Reform Act.

Smith entered Parliament in 1791 as member for Lostwithiel, and also represented Midhurst and Wendover in a parliamentary career spread over forty years.

Family and legacy
Smith lived at Selsdon in Surrey. He married Frances Mary Mosley (bap. 24 March 1773, d. 5 July 1844), daughter of Sir John Parker Mosley, 1st Baronet, and Elizabeth Bayley. They had 9 sons and 6 daughters: 
George Robert Smith MP (of Selsdon Park) (1793–1869) m. Jane Maberly (1800–1879, the daughter of John Maberly). 
Oswald Smith (of Blendon Hall) (1794–1863) m. Henrietta Mildred Hodgson (1805–1891). 
John Henry Smith (of Purley Bury) (1795–1887). 
Thomas Charles Smith (1797–1876).  
Edward Peploe Smith (1803–1847) m.1 Henrietta Bailey, m.2 Harriet Chester. 
Arthur Smith (1804–1831). 
Edmund Smith (1809–1873) m. Hester Lushington (1816–1888). 
Mosley Smith (1810–1869). 
Alfred Smith, of Kingswood (1815–1886) m. Mary Wigram (1821–1869). 
Frances Mary Smith (1796–1867) m. Robert Mosley Master, "the Clogging Parson", Archdeacon of Manchester.
Georgina Elizabeth Smith (1801–1828) m. Rev. Edward Serocold. 
Emily Smith (1806–1879) m. Rev. Charles Mayne. 
Catherine Smith (1807–1870) m. Edward Wigram. 
Sophia Sarah Smith (1812–1883) m. Rev. William Wigram. 
Augusta Mary Smith (1816–1892) m. Rev. Lewis Deedes.

His memorial in All Saints Church, Sanderstead, states:

His family were slave owners, his son George Robert Smith placing a claim to be compensated for the freedom of 461 slaves, worth £17,945 10s 3d, the largest claim made in Croydon.

References

www.thepeerage.com

External links 
 

1765 births
1836 deaths
Members of the Parliament of Great Britain for constituencies in Cornwall
Members of the Parliament of Great Britain for English constituencies
British MPs 1790–1796
Members of the Parliament of the United Kingdom for English constituencies
UK MPs 1801–1802
UK MPs 1802–1806
UK MPs 1806–1807
UK MPs 1807–1812
UK MPs 1812–1818
UK MPs 1820–1826
UK MPs 1826–1830
UK MPs 1830–1831
George
Directors of the British East India Company